Cheshire Fire and Rescue Service is the statutory fire and rescue service for the English county of Cheshire, consisting of the unitary authorities of Cheshire East, Cheshire West and Chester, Halton and Warrington. It operates 28 fire stations. The service is led by Chief Fire Officer Alex Waller, who was appointed in 2022, and the Service Management Team. It is managed by the Cheshire Fire Authority, which is composed of councillors from the local communities of Cheshire, Halton and Warrington. They make decisions on issues such as policy, finance and resources.

Operations 

It has 28 fire stations,
with a headquarters in Winsford. The region features several large urban areas such as Warrington and Chester, an extensive transport infrastructure and one of the highest concentrations of petrochemical industries in the country. It is in close proximity to two major airports: Manchester and Liverpool.

The service responds to emergency incidents - known as Emergency Response (ER) across the four unitary council areas of:
Halton
Warrington
Cheshire East
Cheshire West and Chester

A total of 28 fire stations, with 39 fire engines, are strategically sited throughout the county.  These are broken down as:

 Seven wholetime-only shift fire stations crewed 24/7
 Two wholetime shift fire stations crewed 24/7, with an additional on-call crew
 Six day-crewed stations (three nucleus) crewed during the day and by on-call staff at night
 13 stations crewed by on-call personnel 24/7

Performance
In 2018/2019, every fire and rescue service in England and Wales was subjected to a statutory inspection by Her Majesty's Inspectorate of Constabulary and Fire & Rescue Services (HIMCFRS). Another cycle of inspections was carried out starting in 2021. The inspections investigate how well the service performs in each of three areas. On a scale of outstanding, good, requires improvement and inadequate, Cheshire Fire and Rescue Service was rated as follows:

See also

List of British firefighters killed in the line of duty

References

External links 

 
Cheshire Fire and Rescue Service at HMICFRS

Fire and rescue services of England
Organisations based in Cheshire